Livlægens Besøg (The Visit of the Royal Physician) is a 2009 Danish-language opera by Bo Holten based on the best-selling Swedish novel Livläkarens besök by Per Olov Enquist.

Recording
The Visit of the Royal Physician  DVD (Sung in Danish with English subtitles) 2009 - Johan Reuter (Johann Friedrich Struensee), Gert Henning-Jensen (King Christian VII), Elisabeth Jansson (Queen Caroline Mathilde), Sten Byriel (Ove Høegh-Guldberg), Djina Mai-Mai (Bootee-Caterine) & Gitta-Maria Sjöberg (Queen Dowager Juliane Marie) Royal Danish Opera Choir & Royal Danish Orchestra, Bo Holten. Da Capo

References

Operas
2009 operas
Danish-language operas
Cultural depictions of Christian VII of Denmark
Cultural depictions of Caroline Matilda of Great Britain
Operas based on real people
Operas set in Denmark
Operas set in the 18th century
Operas based on novels